Chongqing North Station North Square is an interchange station on Line 4 and Line 10 of Chongqing Rail Transit. Located in Chongqing's Yubei District, it serves the nearby Chongqing North railway station.

It opened on December 28, 2017 with the opening of the first phase of Line 10. On December 28, 2018, it became an interchange station with the opening of Line 4.

Station structure

References

Railway stations in Chongqing
Railway stations in China opened in 2017
Chongqing Rail Transit stations